Getting to Know You is a short story collection by American writer David Marusek. It contains all of his published science fiction stories as of its publication. Includes an introduction and a commentary on each story by the author.

Contents
 "The Wedding Album" (1999)
 "The Earth is on the Mend" (1993)
 "Yurek Rutz. Yurek Rutz. Yurek Rutz." (1999)
 "A Boy in Cathyland" (2001)
 "We Were Out of Our Minds with Joy" (1995)
 "VTV" (2000)
 "Cabbages and Kale or: How We Downsized North America" (1999)
 "Getting to Know You" (1997)
 "Listen to Me" (2003)
 "My Morning Glory" (2006)

Awards and nominations
 Quill Awards Science Fiction/Fantasy/Horror nominee(2007)

Sources, external links, quotations
 BookSpotCentral review by Matt Denault
 UberReview review by Ryan Freebern
 Greenman review by Richard Dansky
 Scifi.com review by Paul Di Filippo
 Official site of the publisher

References

2007 short story collections
Science fiction short story collections
Subterranean Press books